Victor Caballero (born August 26, 1960) is a former tennis player from Paraguay, who represented his native country as a lucky loser at the 1988 Summer Olympics in Seoul. There he was defeated in the first round by qualifier Zeeshan Ali from India.

Caballero represented Paraguay at the Davis Cup on a single occasion, playing in a dead rubber against Jaroslav Navrátil after Paraguay defeated Czechoslovakia in the first round of 1983 World Group. Caballero was defeated by Navrátil 2–6 0–6.

References

sports-reference
 
 
 

1960 births
Living people
Paraguayan male tennis players
Tennis players at the 1988 Summer Olympics
Olympic tennis players of Paraguay